This is the discography for American hip hop musician Murs.

Solo albums

Collaborative albums

EPs 

 Comurshul (1996)
 Bac for No Good Reason (1996)
 3:16 the EP (1999)
 Do More + Yeah EP (2000)
 Varsity Blues (2002)
 Def Cover (2003)
 Walk Like a Man (2005)
 Varsity Blues 2 (2011)
 Murs In Miami (2020)
 Take It Easy My Brother Murs (with El Lif Beatz) (2023)

Singles

Mixtapes 

 Mursworld 2011 Winter/Spring (2011)
 Shut Your Trap (with Curtiss King) (2014)

Compilations 

 Walk Like a Man (2005)
 The Genocide in Sudan (2005)
 Murs 3:16 Presents... Murs and the Misadventures of the Nova Express (2007)

DVDs 

 MCTV (1998)
 Walk Like a Man (2005)
 Murray's Revenge: The DVD (2007)

Guest appearances 

 Eligh - "7 Years (Wandering)" from A Story of 2 Worlds (1997)
 The Opus - "First Contact" from First Contact 001 (2002)
 Luckyiam - "Fuck Heroes" from Justify the Means (2002)
 Pigeon John - "2 Step" from Is Dating Your Sister (2002)
 RJD2 - "Final Frontier (Remix)" from The Horror (2003)
 Omid - "Live from Tokyo" from Monolith (2003)
 Scarub - "Aye Dios Mio" from A New Perspective (2004)
 Big Pooh - "Now" from Sleepers (2005)
 Subtitle - "Crew Cut (for Sale)" from Young Dangerous Heart (2005)
 DJ Z-Trip - "Breakfast Club" from Shifting Gears (2005)
 Oh No - "In This" from Exodus into Unheard Rhythms (2006)
 Mr. Lif - "Murs Iz My Manager" from Mo' Mega (2006)
 Terror - "Dibbs & Murs Check In" from Always the Hard Way (2006)
 Mestizo - "Even" from Dream State (2007)
 Busy P - "To Protect and Entertain" from Ed Rec, Vol. 3 (2008)
 The Grouch - "The Bay to LA" from Show You the World (2009)
 Bicasso - "It's On" from Rebel Musiq (2009)
 Skream - "8 Bit Baby" from Outside the Box (2010)
 2Mex - "Rollercoaster" from My Fanbase Will Destroy You (2010)
 Kendrick Lamar - "She Needs Me (Remix)" from Overly Dedicated (2010)
 Isaiah Toothtaker - "Get Housed Homeboy" and "WTF You Say" from Illuminati Thug Mafia (2011)
 Evidence - "Outta My Mind" (2010)
 Potluck - "Hands Up" from Rhymes and Resin (2011)
 Tabi Bonney - "Hip Hop & Love" from The Summer Years (2011)
 Ab-Soul - "Big Payback" from Longterm Mentality (2011)
 ¡Mayday! - "Hardcore Bitches" from Take Me to Your Leader  (2012)
 Self Jupiter & Kenny Segal - "Altered States" from The Kleenrz (2012)
 Isaiah Toothtaker - "LA Nights" from Sea Punk Funk (2012)
 Cadalack Ron + Briefcase - "Dead Horse" from Times Is Hard (2012)
 Jonathan Emile "Edge of The World" from The Lover/Fighter Document LP (2015)
 Del the Funky Homosapien, Fashawn & Black Thought - "Rise Up" from Street Fighter V (2016)
 Dream Junkies - "Left Coast" from Good Religion (2016)

References 

Hip hop discographies
Discographies of American artists